Communal burrow refers to the habitat built by some species of mammals as a community habitat. There are some species that build burrows, but not communal burrows; and there are some species that live in communal groups, but do not construct burrows or any other type of habitat.

Overview
A  burrow is a hole or tunnel excavated into the ground by an animal to create a space suitable for habitation, temporary refuge, or as a byproduct of locomotion.  Burrows provide a form of shelter against predation and exposure to the elements and can be found in nearly every biome and among various biological interactions. Many different animal species are known to form burrows. These species range from small invertebrates, such as the Corophium arenarium, to very large vertebrate species such as the polar bear. Burrows can be constructed into a wide variety of substrates and can range in complexity from a simple tube a few centimeters long to a complex network of interconnecting tunnels and chambers hundreds or thousands of meters in total length. An example of this well-developed burrow would be a rabbit warren.

Types of burrows 

Animals can create burrows using a variety of methods. Burrowing animals can be divided into three categories: primary excavators, secondary modifiers and simple occupants. Primary excavators are the animals that originally dig and construct the burrow, and are generally very strong. Some animals considered to be primary excavators are the prairie dog and the aardvark. Pygmy gerbil are an example of secondary modifiers, as they do not build an original burrow, but will live inside a burrow made by other animals and improve or change some aspects of the burrow for their own purpose. The third category, simple occupants, neither build nor modify the burrow but simply live inside or use it for their own purpose.  Some species of Bird will actually make use of burrows built by tortoises, which is an example of simple occupancy. These animals can also be referred to as commensals.

Specific species

Common degus

Common degus are highly social. They live in burrows, and, by digging communally, they are able to construct larger and more elaborate burrows than they could on their own. Degus digging together coordinate their activities, forming digging chains. Females living in the same group have been shown to spontaneously nest communally; they nurse one another's young. They spend a large amount of time on the surface, where they forage for food. When foraging, their ability to detect predators is increased in larger groups, and each animal needs to spend less time in vigilance.

Common degus exhibit a wide array of communication techniques.  They have an elaborate vocal repertoire comprising up to 15 different sounds, and the young need to be able to hear their mother's calls if the emotional systems in their brains are to develop properly. They use their urine to scent mark, and experiments have shown that they react to one another's marks, although in males the hormone testosterone may suppress their sense of smell somewhat.

Common degus are seasonal breeders; the breeding season for wild degus begins in the Chilean autumn when day and night are roughly equal, with pups born in early to mid-spring. 

Common degu pups are born relatively precocial, fully furred and with eyes open, and their auditory and visual systems are functional at birth. Unlike most other rodents, male common degus also take part in protecting and raising their pups until they are old enough to leave the family.

Plains viscacha

Plains viscacha live in communal burrow systems in groups containing one or more males, several females, and immatures. Viscachas forage in groups at night and aggregate underground during the day. All members of a group use burrows throughout the communal burrow system and participate in digging at the burrows. Alarm calls are given primarily by adult males. The long-term social unit of the plains viscacha is the female group. Resident males disappear each year and new males join groups of females. Viscachas live in colonies that range from a few individuals to hundreds. To keep up with the colony chatter, they have acquired an impressive repertoire of vocalizations that are used in social interactions. Dominance is absent among females. Members of a social group share a common foraging area around the communal burrow system, and feed on a variety of grasses and forbs, occasionally browsing on low shrubs.
They collect branches and heavy objects to cover the burrow entrance. When they live close to human settlements, tend to hoard brooms, tables, garden tools, firewood, trinkets, pieces of concrete, and many human-made objects to cover the burrow.

Daurian pikas

Daurian pikas have been observed sharing burrows with several other mammal species. They occasionally “visit” burrows of Altai marmots and Mongolian pikas. In turn, their burrows are visited by ground squirrels, and sometimes by burrowing birds. Due to low competition and predation rates, the limiting factor on Daurian pika populations is winter.

Prairie dogs

Highly social, prairie dogs live in large colonies or "towns" and collections of prairie dog families that can span hundreds of acres. The prairie dog family groups are the most basic units of its society. Members of a family group inhabit the same territory.   Family groups of black-tailed and Mexican prairie dogs are called "coteries", while "clans" are used to describe family groups of white-tailed, Gunnison’s, and Utah prairie dogs. Although these two family groups are similar, coteries tend to be more closely knit than clans. Members of a family group interact through oral contact or "kissing" and grooming one another.   They do not perform these behaviors with prairie dogs from other family groups.   

A prairie dog town may contain 15–26 family groups. There may also be subgroups within a town, called "wards", which are separated by a physical barrier. Family groups exist within these wards. Most prairie dog family groups are made up of one adult breeding male, two to three adult females and one to two male offspring and one to two female offspring. Females remain in their natal groups for life and are thus the source of stability in the groups. Males leave their natal groups when they mature to find another family group to defend and breed in. Some family groups contain more breeding females than one male can control, so have more than one breeding adult male in them. Among these multiple-male groups, some may contain males that have friendly relationships, but the majority contain males that have largely antagonistic relationships. In the former, the males tend to be related, while in the latter, they tend not to be related. Two to three groups of females may be controlled by one male. However, among these female groups, there are no friendly relations.

The average prairie dog territory takes up . Territories have well-established borders that coincide with physical barriers such as rocks and trees. The resident male of a territory defends it and antagonistic behavior will occur between two males of different families to defend their territories. These interactions may happen 20 times per day and last five minutes. When two prairie dogs encounter each other at the edges of their territories, they will start staring, make bluff charges, flare their tails, chatter their teeth, and sniff each other's perianal scent glands. When fighting, prairie dogs will bite, kick and ram each other.  If their competitor is around their size or smaller, the females will participate in fighting. Otherwise, if a competitor is sighted, the females signal for the resident male.

Pygmy rabbits
Pygmy rabbits are normally found in areas on deep soils with tall, dense sagebrush which they use for shelter and food. Individual sagebrush plants in areas inhabited by pygmy rabbits are often 6 feet (1.8 m) or more in height.  Extensive, well-used runways interlace the sage thickets and provide travel and escape routes. Dense stands of big sagebrush along streams, roads, and fencerows provide dispersal corridors for pygmy rabbits.

The pygmy rabbit is the only leporid native to North America that digs burrows.    Juveniles use burrows more than other age groups. Early reproductive activities of adults may be concentrated at burrows. When pygmy rabbits can utilize sagebrush cover, burrow use is decreased. Pygmy rabbits use burrows more in the winter for thermal cover than at other times of the year.

Burrows are usually located on slopes at the base of sagebrush plants, and face north to east. Burrows typically have 4 or 5 entrances but may have as few as 2 or as many as 10. In Oregon, pygmy rabbits inhabited areas where soils were significantly deeper and looser than soils at adjacent sites. Site selection was probably related to ease of excavation of burrows. In areas where soil is shallow pygmy rabbits live in holes among volcanic rocks, in stone walls, around abandoned buildings, and in burrows made by badgers (Taxidea taxus) and marmots (Marmota flaviventris).

Some areas inhabited by pygmy rabbits are covered with several feet of snow for up to 2 or more months during the winter. During periods when the snow has covered most of the sagebrush, pygmy rabbits tunnel beneath the snow to find food. Snow tunnels are approximately the same height and width as burrows. They are quite extensive and extend from one sagebrush to another. Above ground movement during the winter months is restricted to these tunnel systems.

See also

 Habitat
 Community
 Social animals

References

Habitats
Shelters built or used by animals